Hard Case Crime is an American imprint of hardboiled crime novels founded in 2004 by Charles Ardai (also the founder of the Internet service Juno Online Services) and Max Phillips. The series recreates, in editorial form and content, the flavor of the paperback crime novels of the 1940s and '50s. The covers feature original illustrations done in a style familiar from the golden age of paperbacks (the 1950s and '60s), credited to artists such as Robert McGinnis and Glen Orbik.

Overview 
Hard Case's list includes both reprints of books from the pulp era (typically labeled Complete and unabridged on the cover), and new novels written for the collection (typically labeled First publication anywhere). The top-selling entries in the series to date have been novels by Stephen King: The Colorado Kid (2005), which later became the basis for the SyFy television series Haven, Joyland (2013), and Later (2021).

Eight novels published by Hard Case have been nominated for the Edgar Award: In 2005, Little Girl Lost, by Richard Aleas (a pseudonym for Hard Case Crime co-founder Charles Ardai that is both an anagram of Ardai's name and a play on "alias"), was nominated as Best First Novel by an American Author, and Domenic Stansberry's The Confession won the award for Best Paperback Original; in 2006, 2008, 2009, 2014, and 2023 respectively, Allan Guthrie's Kiss Her Goodbye, Russell Hill's Robbie's Wife, Christa Faust's Money Shot, Stephen King's Joyland, and Max Allan Collins's Quarry's Blood were nominated for Best Paperback Original. In 2022, James Kestrel's Five Decembers won the award for Best Novel.

Max Phillips' Fade to Blonde won the 2005 Shamus Award for Best Paperback Novel of the Year, and Charles Ardai's pseudonymous "Richard Aleas" novel Songs of Innocence won the same award in 2008. Ardai also received the Edgar Award in 2007, for his short story "The Home Front."

Ownership 
Between 2004 and 2010, Hard Case Crime was published through a collaboration between Ardai's company, Winterfall LLC, and Dorchester Publishing. After an announcement in August 2010 that Subterranean Press would be publishing "an exclusive Hard Case Crime volume," starting in 2011, Titan Books replaced Dorchester as publisher of the series.  Two volumes in the series, one reprinting a pair of early Lawrence Block novels, 69 Barrow Street and Strange Embrace, the other a collection of Lawrence Block short stories, Catch and Release, ultimately were published by Subterranean Press.

Since the imprint's move to Titan Books/Titan Comics, Hard Case Crime has released a number of comics and graphic novels in the same hard-boiled vein as the book division.

Titles

Graphic novels

References

External links
Hard Case Crime Official Web Site

Series of books
Pulp fiction
Publishing companies established in 2004